.biz is a generic top-level domain (gTLD) in the Domain Name System of the Internet. It is intended for registration of domains to be used by businesses. The name is a phonetic spelling of the first syllable of business.

History 

The  TLD was created to relieve some of the demand for domain names in the  top-level domain, and to provide an alternative for businesses whose preferred domain name in  had already been registered by another party. There are no specific legal or geographic qualifications to register a  domain name, except that it must be for "bona fide business or commercial use." It was created in 2001 along with several other domains as the first batch of new gTLDs approved by ICANN in the expansion of the Domain Name System following the increased interest in internet commerce in the late 1990s.  The TLD, originally administered by Neustar until 2020, is currently administered by GoDaddy and registrations are processed via accredited registrars.

In contrast to other newly installed top-level domains, the  registry did not implement a sunrise period to grant trademark owners first chance at registration, but instead used a procedure it called the "IP Claims Service" whereby trademark owners could file intellectual property claims in advance and then challenge any eventual registrant through a policy named Startup Trademark Opposition Policy (STOP). This process was created by Jeffrey J. Neuman as proof-of-concept protection service and an alternative to the Sunrise policy.

Use
On June 23, 2008 at the ICANN 32nd International Public Meeting in Paris, the  registry announced that it had officially surpassed two million registrations worldwide.

In Turkish, biz means 'we' and is used in some sites such as turkleriz.biz (We are the Turks) and fenerliyiz.biz (We are fans of Fenerbahçe).

Alternative DNS roots
Before ICANN approved of the  top-level domain in the official DNS root, similar domains of the same name were already in use by alternative DNS roots. This created the possibility of a  domain pointing to different IP addresses depending on the specific DNS configuration of a client computer. For this reason, the domain's registry, GoDaddy, requires that a DNS server be officially registered with them on their list of approved DNS servers before a domain registrar may register it in the WHOIS database.

References

External links
 GoDaddy registry operator website
 

Generic top-level domains
Computer-related introductions in 2001

de:Top-Level-Domain#Nichtgesponserte Domains (uTLD)
sv:Toppdomän#Generiska toppdomäner